The Ulster Towns Cup is a rugby union competition organized by the Ulster branch of the Irish Rugby Football Union.

It is confined to teams outside of Belfast. Since the resumption of play after World War II, where a town is represented by a senior club, their second team is the one that competes.

The Final is traditionally played on Easter Monday at Ravenhill.

The most successful club is Dungannon with 20 wins (19 outright wins and 1 shared win). The trophy is currently held by Ballyclare RFC.

FINALS

(Records are incomplete)

1880s

 1883 City of Derry
 1884 Dungannon
 1885 Bessbrook
 1886 Bessbrook & Dungannon (shared)
 1887 Bessbrook
 1888 Bessbrook
 1889 City of Derry

1890s

 1890 Armagh
 1891 City of Derry
 1892 City of Derry
 1893 City of Derry
 1894 Dungannon
 1895 Dungannon 1 goal and 1 try – nil Dundalk
 1896 Dungannon
 1897 City of Derry
 1898 City of Derry 3-0 Dungannon
 1899 Dungannon

1900s

 1900 Competition abandoned over a ground dispute between City of Derry & Dungannon
 1901 Competition abandoned over a ground dispute between City of Derry & Dungannon
 1902 Dungannon 18-0 City of Derry
 1903 Dungannon
 1904 Bangor 11-3 City of Derry
 1905 Dungannon 24-0 City of Derry
 1906 Bangor 12-10 City of Derry
 1907 Dungannon 15-3 Bangor

(1907 - Bangor successfully protested the result of the original final, as Dungannon fielded an ineligible player and a replay was ordered. The original game finished as a 19–3 victory for Dungannon)

 1908 City of Derry 8-3 Bangor
 1909 Bangor 16-8 Armagh

1910s

 1910 Armagh 13-0 Carrickfergus
 1911 Carrickfergus 11-3 Armagh
 1912 Dungannon 9-3 Armagh
 1913 Carrickfergus 8-3 Larne
 1914 Larne 9-3 Carrickfergus
 1915-1919 Not played

1920s

 1920 Bangor 5-3 Armagh
 1921 Larne 7-0 Donaghadee
 1922 Lurgan 6-0 Larne
 1923 Bangor 19-8 Dungannon
 1924 Donaghadee 4-3 Dungannon
 1925 Lurgan 11-4 Larne
 1926 Lurgan 17-8 Donaghadee
 1927 Coleraine 11-3 Lurgan
 1928 Ballymena 3-0 Lurgan
 1929 Armagh 8-6 Bangor

1930s

 1930 Bangor 9-7 Dungannon
 1931 Coleraine 14-9 Larne
 1932 Ballymena 16-3 Coleraine
 1933 Banbridge 3-0 Portadown
 1934 Enniskillen 16-6 Dungannon
 1935 City of Derry 9-6 Ballymena
 1936 City of Derry 10-3 Dromore
 1937 Enniskillen 5-3 Dromore (Replay - Game 1: 0-0 after extra time)
 1938 Coleraine 12-3 Limavady
 1939 Dromore 17-3 Donaghadee

1940s

 1940-1945 Not played
 1946 Bangor 11-6 City of Derry (after extra time)
 1947 Armagh 9-8 Bangor
 1948 Dungannon 8-0 Ballymena
 1949 Dungannon 8-3 Ballymena

1950s

 1950 Dungannon 5-3 Lurgan
 1951 Armagh 3-0 Ballymena
 1952 Lurgan 11-3 Armagh
 1953 Ballymena 13-3 Donaghadee
 1954 Coleraine 5-0 Lurgan
 1955 Lurgan 3-0 Strabane
 1956 Bangor 11-6 Lurgan
 1957 Portadown 12-0 Banbridge
 1958 Lurgan 11-3 Donaghadee
 1959 Portadown 11-0 Lurgan

1960s

 1960 Dungannon II 9-6 Ballymena II
 1961 Dungannon II 14-3 City of Derry
 1962 Ards 8-3 Dungannon II
 1963 Ballymena II 9-6 Coleraine
 1964 Ballynahinch 11-0 Bangor (Replay after 6–6 draw)
 1965 Dungannon II 3-0 Armagh
 1966 Dungannon II 5-3 Armagh
 1967 Coleraine 14-0 Dungannon II
 1968 Bangor 26-11 Dungannon II
 1969 Bangor 14-12 Ards

1970s

 1970 Ballymena II 11-3 Dungannon II
 1971 Armagh 6-3 Ballymena II
 1972 Bangor II 3-0 Ards
 1973 Ballymena II 58-7 Ballyclare
 1974 Ballymena II 23-6 Magherafelt
 1975 Bangor II 3-0 Dungannon II
 1976 Ballyclare 19-6 Magherafelt
 1977 Ballymena II 21-4 Lisburn
 1978 Ballyclare 18-6 Armagh
 1979 Ballymena II 6-3 Ballyclare

1980s

 1980 Ballyclare 15-3 City of Derry (Replay - Game 1: 3-3)
 1981 Armagh 15-6 Ballynahinch
 1982 Carrickfergus 3-0 Larne
 1983 Magherafelt 9-0 Coleraine
 1984 Coleraine 9-4 Carrickfergus
 1985 Lisburn 12-6 Magherafelt
 1986 Ballyclare 18-4 Magherafelt
 1987 Ballynahinch 9-4 Enniskillen
 1988 Ballynahinch 9-4 Banbridge
 1989 Banbridge 9-3 Antrim

1990s

 1990 Ballynahinch 18-11 Ballymena II
 1991 Ballymena II 13-7 Omagh
 1992 Carrickfergus 9-3 Ballyclare
 1993 Banbridge 23-8 Ballyclare
 1994 Ballymena II 24-10 Magherafelt
 1995 Ballynahinch 15-13 Banbridge
 1996 Dungannon II 37-8 Coleraine
 1997 Coleraine 19-17 Holywood
 1998 Coleraine 18-8 Dromore
 1999 Dungannon II 30-10 Coleraine

2000s

 2000 Ballymena II 42-11 Limavady
 2001 Magherafelt 57-31 Omagh
 2002 Omagh 32-26 Ballynahinch II
 2003 Ards 27-20 Coleraine
 2004 Ballyclare 30-26 Coleraine
 2005 Ballymena II 23-18 Magherafelt
 2006 Coleraine 26-22 Clogher Valley
 2007 Clogher Valley 13-9 Enniskillen
 2008 Armagh 49-6 Portadown
 2009 City of Derry 14-10 Ballynahinch II

2010s

 2010 Ballymoney 15-14 Clogher Valley
 2011 Clogher Valley 34-7 Ballynahinch II
 2012 Clogher Valley 11-0 Ballymena II
 2013 Ballyclare 28-28 City of Derry II after extra time TROPHY SHARED
 2014 Clogher Valley 15-7 Donaghadee
 2015 Ballynahinch II 17-13 Clogher Valley
 2016 Bangor 31-25 Enniskillen
 2017 Ballynahinch II 17-13 Enniskillen
 2018 Ballyclare 27-6 Portadown
 2019 Enniskillen 19-0 Ballyclare

2020s

 2020 Ballynahinch II v Ballyclare Trophy Shared (COVID-19)
 2022 Ballyclare 32-27 Dromore

Sources

Rugby union competitions in Ulster